Asterometridae is a family of echinoderms belonging to the order Comatulida.

Genera:
 Asterometra Clark, 1907
 Pterometra Clark, 1909
 Sinometra Yulin, 1984

References

Comatulida
Echinoderm families